Stevan Vujović (born 7 April 1990) is a Montenegrin handball player for Minaur Baia Mare and the Montenegro national team.

Club career
Over the course of his career, Vujović played for Vardar (two spells), Crvena zvezda, Antequera, Lovćen, Sélestat, HSG Wetzlar, GC Amicitia Zürich, Metalurg Skopje, Balmazújvárosi KK, Dobrogea Sud Constanța and Motor Zaporizhzhia.

International career
At international level, Vujović represented Montenegro in four major tournaments, including three European Championships (2014, 2018 and 2020).

Honours
Vardar
 Macedonian Handball Super League: 2008–09
 Macedonian Handball Cup: 2007–08

References

External links
 LNH record
 MKSZ record
 

1990 births
Living people
Sportspeople from Cetinje
Montenegrin male handball players
RK Vardar players
RK Crvena zvezda players
HSG Wetzlar players
HC Dobrogea Sud Constanța players
HC Motor Zaporizhia players
Liga ASOBAL players
Expatriate handball players
Montenegrin expatriate sportspeople in North Macedonia
Montenegrin expatriate sportspeople in Serbia
Montenegrin expatriate sportspeople in Spain
Montenegrin expatriate sportspeople in France
Montenegrin expatriate sportspeople in Germany
Montenegrin expatriate sportspeople in Switzerland
Montenegrin expatriate sportspeople in Hungary
Montenegrin expatriate sportspeople in Romania
Montenegrin expatriate sportspeople in Ukraine
Mediterranean Games competitors for Montenegro
Competitors at the 2018 Mediterranean Games